Osgood's leaf-eared mouse (Phyllotis osgoodi) is a species of rodent in the family Cricetidae. It is found only in the Altiplano of northeastern Chile. The species is named after American zoologist Wilfred Hudson Osgood.

References

Musser, G. G. and M. D. Carleton. 2005. Superfamily Muroidea. pp. 894–1531 in Mammal Species of the World a Taxonomic and Geographic Reference. D. E. Wilson and D. M. Reeder eds. Johns Hopkins University Press, Baltimore.

Mammals of Chile
Phyllotis
Mammals described in 1945
Taxonomy articles created by Polbot
Endemic fauna of Chile